"You're Lucky I Love You" is a song recorded by American country music artist Susan Ashton.  It was released in May 1999 as the second single from the album Closer.  The song reached No. 37 on the Billboard Hot Country Singles & Tracks chart. The song was written by Neil Thrasher and Marla Cannon-Goodman.

Chart performance

References

1999 singles
1999 songs
Susan Ashton songs
Songs written by Marla Cannon-Goodman
Songs written by Neil Thrasher
Song recordings produced by Emory Gordy Jr.
Capitol Records Nashville singles